The 2001 International League season took place from April to September 2001.

The Louisville Bats defeated the Scranton/Wilkes-Barre Red Barons to win the league championship.

Attendance
Buffalo Bisons - 666,202
Charlotte Knights - 370,406
Columbus Clippers - 503,824
Durham Bulls - 505,314
Indianapolis Indians - 604,407
Louisville Bats - 663,961
Norfolk Tides - 505,074
Ottawa Lynx - 205,916
Pawtucket Red Sox - 647,928
Richmond Braves - 447,020
Rochester Red Wings - 455,123
Scranton/Wilkes-Barre Red Barons - 458,491
Syracuse SkyChiefs - 423,405
Toledo Mud Hens - 300,079

Playoffs

Division Series
North Division Champion Buffalo faced IL Wild Card Champion Scranton. Scranton won the series, winning game five in 19 innings, by a score of 6-2.

South Division Champions Norfolk faced West Division Champions Louisville. Louisville won the series.

Championship series
Scranton/Wilkes-Barre faced Louisville in the Governors' Cup Final. Louisville won game one on Sept. 10, and was declared champion when the rest of the series was cancelled due to the September 11 attacks.

References

External links
International League official website 

 
International League seasons